George F. Montgomery Jr. (born August 21, 1933) was an American politician.

Born in Ann Arbor, Michigan, Montgomery graduated from Cass Technical High School in Detroit, Michigan. He then served in the United States Army from 1956 to 1958. In 1959, Montgomery received his bachelor's degree from Wayne State University. He taught in the public schools. He served in the Michigan House of Representatives and was a Democrat. His father George F. Montgomery Sr. also served in the Michigan Legislature.

References 

1933 births
Living people
People from Ann Arbor, Michigan
Wayne State University alumni
Military personnel from Michigan
Educators from Michigan
Democratic Party members of the Michigan House of Representatives